Eshen Rural District is a rural district (dehestan) in Mehrdasht District, Najafabad County, Isfahan Province, Iran. At the 2006 census, its population was 5,382, in 1,363 families.  The rural district has 6 villages.

References 

Rural Districts of Isfahan Province
Najafabad County